Yvette Bissonnet is a politician in Montreal, Quebec, Canada. She was a member of the Montreal city council from 2001 to 2009, serving as a member of the Montreal Island Citizens Union (MICU; renamed Union Montreal in 2007). She had previously served on the Saint-Leonard council before that city's amalgamation into Montreal.

Bissonnet is married to Michel Bissonnet, a former Liberal member of the National Assembly of Quebec and the current borough mayor of Saint-Leonard. She worked as an administrative secretary before seeking public office.

Early political career
Bissonnet was first elected to the Saint-Leonard council in the 1986 municipal election, winning a narrow victory in the city's seventh ward as a member of mayor Raymond Renaud's Ralliement de Saint-Léonard (RdSL). She was forty-six years old during this campaign. The RdSL won ten out of twelve seats on council, and Bissonett initially served as a supporter of Renaud's administration.

In May 1988, Frank Zampino and seven other RdSL councillors resigned from the party to sit as independents. Bissonnet was one of the rebel councillors; she later joined Zampino's Parti Municipal and was re-elected under its banner in the 1990 municipal election.

The Parti Municipal dominated political life in Saint-Leonard during the 1990s, and Bissonnet was returned without opposition in the 1994 and 1998 elections.

Montreal city councillor
Saint-Leonard was amalgamated into the City of Montreal in 2001, and Bissonnet was elected as one of the community's three representatives to the Montreal city council in that year's municipal election. The Montreal Island Citizens Union won a majority on council, and Bissonnet supported new mayor Gérald Tremblay's administration. She was deputy mayor from January to April 2002, from September to December 2002, and again from May to August 2003, and served on the Montreal Transit Corporation. She was re-elected in the 2005 municipal election also served as interim borough mayor of Saint-Leonard in 2008, following Zampino's resignation.

In 2005, Bissonnet introduced a resolution at a meeting of the Saint-Leonard borough council to approve a twenty-year contract for the Dessau subsidiary Sogep to manage the community's parks, pavilions, and tennis courts. The resolution was approved. In 2009, the Montreal Gazette reported that Saint-Leonard was paying $1.06 million more under this arrangement than under its previous contract.

Bissonnet did not seek re-election in 2009.

Electoral record

References

Living people
Montreal city councillors
Women in Quebec politics
Women municipal councillors in Canada
Year of birth missing (living people)